Evergreen High School can refer to one of the following institutions:
Evergreen Schools Sokoto Nigeria- Gidado road adjacent State Library Sokoto 
Evergreen Schools Enugu, Enugu State Nigeria
Evergreen High School (Oakhurst, California)
Evergreen High School (Colorado)
Evergreen High School (Ohio)
Evergreen High School (King County, Washington)
Evergreen High School (Vancouver, Washington)

See also 
 Evergreen School (disambiguation)
 Evergreen School District (disambiguation)